Le Phare is an indoor sporting arena located in Chambéry, France.  The capacity of the arena is 4,500 people for handball until 14,000 for Concerts and it has a total Large Area  with 29074 m2  It is currently home for Chambéry Savoie Mont-Blanc team handball team.

References
The information in this article is based on that in its French equivalent.

Indoor arenas in France
Sport in Chambéry
Buildings and structures in Chambéry
Sports venues in Savoie
Sports venues completed in 2009
2009 establishments in France
Handball venues in France
21st-century architecture in France